MV Cenred was one of Wightlink's 'C' class vehicle and passenger ferries on their route from Lymington to Yarmouth on the Isle of Wight.

History
Cenred was built in 1973 for Sealink's Lymington to Yarmouth route by Robb Caledon Shipbuilders Ltd in Dundee, Scotland. The ship was named after Cenred of Wessex. They all passed to Wightlink after the privatisation of Sealink in 1984. Cenred remained on the route for her whole life.

Laid up at Marchwood in 2009,, Cenred was sold for scrapping and moved to Harlingen, Netherlands in March 2010, en route to Esbjerg in Denmark, in the hope of finding a new owner. Along with her sister ships, Cenred was broken up at Esbjerg in May 2010.

Layout
The car deck had ramps fore and aft, allowing full ro-ro operation. Passenger accommodation was above the car deck, with the bridge above that.

Service
Cenred operated the Lymington to Yarmouth ferry service from 1973 to 2008. Along with the two other 'C' class ships owned by Wightlink she was withdrawn from service on introduction of the three new Wight-class ferries. Cenred was brought back from retirement on 12 March 2009 when  required repairs to her hydraulic ramp.

Footnotes

External links

 Wightlink Website - Wightlink.co.uk

Ferries of England
Ferry transport on the Isle of Wight
1973 ships
Ships built in Dundee